Hamadryas argentea (also called Silvery Buttercup) is a species of plant in the family Ranunculaceae. It is endemic to Falkland Islands. Its natural habitats are temperate dwarf shrub heath and temperate grassland.

References

Ranunculaceae
Flora of the Falkland Islands
Near threatened plants
Taxonomy articles created by Polbot
Taxa named by Joseph Dalton Hooker